Mount Rainier National Park is an American national park located in southeast Pierce County and northeast Lewis County in Washington state. The park was established on March 2, 1899, as the fourth national park in the United States, preserving  including all of Mount Rainier, a  stratovolcano. The mountain rises abruptly from the surrounding land with elevations in the park ranging from 1,600 feet to over 14,000 feet (490–4,300 m). More than 25 glaciers descend the flanks of the volcano, which is often shrouded in clouds that dump enormous amounts of rain and snow.

Carbon Glacier is the largest glacier by volume in the contiguous United States, while Emmons Glacier is the largest glacier by area. Mount Rainier is a popular peak for mountaineering with some 10,000 attempts per year with approximately 50% making it to the summit.

Park purpose
As stated in the foundation document:

History

Ninety-seven percent of the park is preserved as wilderness under the National Wilderness Preservation System as Mount Rainier Wilderness, a designation it received in 1988. It is abutted by the Tatoosh, Clearwater, Glacier View, and William O. Douglas Wildernesses. The park was designated a National Historic Landmark on February 18, 1997, as a showcase for the National Park Service rustic-style architecture of the 1920s and 1930s, exemplified by the Paradise Inn and a masterpiece of early NPS master planning. As a Historic Landmark district, the park was administratively listed on the National Register of Historic Places.

Native Americans
The name of the mountain itself in Lushootseed is "Tacoma", same as a nearby city in the Seattle metro area.

The earliest evidence of human activity in the area which is now Mount Rainier National Park, is a projectile point dated to circa 4,000–5,800 BP (before present) found along Bench Lake Trail (the first section of Snow Lake Trail).

A more substantial archeological find was a rock shelter near Fryingpan Creek, east of Goat Island Mountain. Hunting artifacts were found in the shelter. The shelter would not have been used all year round. Cultural affinities suggest the site was used by Columbia Plateau Tribes from 1000 to 300 BP.

In 1963 the National Park Service contracted Washington State University to study Native American use of the Mount Rainier area. Richard D. Daugherty lead an archeological study of the area and concluded that prehistoric humans used the area most heavily between 8000 and 4500 BP. Allan H. Smith interviewed elderly Native Americans and studied ethnographic literature. He found no evidence of permanent habitation in the park area. The park was used for hunting and gathering and for occasional spirit quests. Smith also came to tentative conclusions that the park was divided among five tribes along watershed boundaries; the Nisqually, Puyallup, Muckleshoot, Yakama, and Taidnapam (Upper Cowlitz). Subsequent studies cast doubt on Smith's theory that the tribes had agreed upon boundaries before they entered into treaties with the United States in 1854–55.

Park creation

On March 2, 1899, President William McKinley signed a bill passed by Congress authorizing the creation of Mount Rainier National Park, the nation's fifth national park. It was the first national park created from a national forest. The Pacific Forest Reserve had been created in 1893 and included Mount Rainier. It was enlarged in 1897 and renamed Mount Rainier Forest Reserve. John Muir had visited Mount Rainier in 1888. Muir and nine others, including Edward Sturgis Ingraham, Charles Piper, and P. B. Van Trump, climbed to the summit in what became the fifth recorded ascent.

The trip to Mount Rainier had played a role in reinvigorating Muir and convincing him to rededicate his life to the preservation of nature as national parks. At the time national forests, called forest reserves at first, were being created throughout the American West, under the utilitarian "conservation-through-use" view of Gifford Pinchot. Muir came to be known as a "preservationist". He wanted nature preserved under the more protected status of national parks. But during the 1890s there was more public support for creating national forests than national parks. During that decade, Muir and his supporters were only able to protect one national forest as a national park. When the Pacific Forest Reserve was created in 1893, Muir quickly persuaded the newly formed Sierra Club to support a movement to protect Rainier as a national park. Other groups soon joined, such as the National Geographic Society and scientific associations wanting Mount Rainier preserved as a place to study volcanism and glaciology. Commercial leaders in Tacoma and Seattle were also in support, as was the Northern Pacific Railway. The effort lasted over five years and involved six different attempts to push a bill through Congress. Congress eventually agreed, but only after acquiring assurances that none of the new park was suitable for farming or mining and that no federal appropriations would be necessary for its management.

2006 flooding
Mount Rainier National Park closed because of extensive flooding as a result of the November 6, 2006 Pineapple Express rainstorm when  of rain fell in a 36-hour period. Campsites and roads throughout the park were washed away. Power to Paradise and Longmire was disrupted.  Sunshine Point Campground, just inside the Nisqually Entrance, was destroyed and has not reopened. Parts of the Carbon River Road, once a vehicle-accessible entrance to the park, also washed out. The road has since remained closed to vehicle traffic. On May 5, 2007, the park reopened to automobile traffic via State Route 706 at the Nisqually Entrance.

Closures

In November 2022, the National Park Service announced that access to the south side of the park beyond Longmire would be closed on weekdays due to inadequate staffing. Several recreation areas, including a sledding hill, were also closed for the rest of the winter season.

Biology

Flora
According to the A. W. Kuchler U.S. Potential natural vegetation types, Mount Rainier National Park has an Alpine Meadows & Barren, or Alpine tundra (52) potential vegetation type with an Alpine Meadow (11) potential vegetation form. The park's vegetation is diverse, reflecting the varied climatic and environmental conditions encountered across the park's 12,800-foot elevation gradient. More than 960 vascular plant species and more than 260 nonvascular plant species have been identified in the park.

Fauna
Mammals that inhabit this national park include cougar, black bear, raccoon, coyote, bobcat, snowshoe hare, weasel, mole, beaver, red fox, porcupine, skunk, marmot, deer, marten, shrew, pika, elk, and mountain goat. The common birds of this park including raptors are the thrush, chickadee, kinglet, northern goshawk, willow flycatcher, spotted owl, steller's jay, Clark's nutcracker, bald eagle, ptarmigan, harlequin duck, grouse, peregrine falcon, Canada jay, golden eagle, grosbeak and finch.

Fish that inhabit the lakes, rivers, and streams within the park include bull trout, cutthroat trout, rainbow trout, mountain whitefish, and sculpins. Anadromous fish enter the park during migratory cycles. Chinook salmon and coho salmon, although rare within the park boundary, can be found spawning in the White, West Fork, Puyallup, Mowich, and Carbon watersheds. Pink salmon spawn on odd-numbered years in heavy numbers up the White River near the park boundary. Due to historical stocking and damming of rivers in and around the park, native numbers of most salmonoids are unknown.

Climate
According to the Köppen climate classification system, the best definition for Mount Rainier National Park is Mediterranean-influenced humid continental climate (Dsb) or subarctic climate (Dsc), depending on the elevation. According to the United States Department of Agriculture, the Plant Hardiness zone at Sunrise Visitor Center ( elevation) is 6a with an average annual extreme minimum temperature of -5.5 °F (-20.8 °C).

The National Park Service says that "Paradise is the snowiest place on Earth where snowfall is measured regularly." During the 1971/72 year,  of snow fell, setting a world record for that year. Subsequently, in the 1998/99 year, Mount Baker Ski Area received .

Major attractions

The entire park was designated a National Historic Landmark District on February 18, 1997, in recognition of the consistently high standard of design and preservation the park's National Park Service rustic-style architecture. The park contains 42 locations designated on the National Register of Historic Places, including four National Historic Landmarks.

Paradise

Paradise is the most popular destination for visitors to Mount Rainier National Park. 62% of the over 1.3 million people who visited the park in 2000 went to Paradise. Paradise, near the subalpine valley of the Paradise River, is the location of the historic Paradise Inn, built in 1916; Paradise Guide House, built in 1920; and Henry M. Jackson Visitor Center, built in 1966 rebuilt in 2008.

Longmire

The area is named after James Longmire, an early settler in Puget Sound. Longmire is surrounded by old-growth Douglas fir, western red cedar and western hemlock.
Longmire is the location of Mount Rainier's National Park Inn, the Longmire Museum, and the 1928 National Park Service Administration Building, which is now a Wilderness Information Center. The National Park Inn is the only accommodation in the park open all year round.

Longmire is the second most popular destination for visitors to Mount Rainier National Park after Paradise. Of the more than 1.3 million people who visited the park in 2000, 38% visited Longmire. Longmire is one of the starting points of the Wonderland Trail.

Sunrise

Sunrise is a lodge and visitor center located in the northeastern part of the park. There are miles of trails located all around Sunrise, such as Mount Fremont, Burroughs Mountain, and Sourdough Ridge. The lodge is reachable via a  turnoff from SR 410 near the White River entrance.

Other developed areas

Located in a deep valley among old growth forest at an elevation below , it is the only developed area of the park without a view of Mount Rainier. The Ohanapecosh Hot Springs, Grove of the Patriarchs, and Silver Falls are all located in the Ohanapecosh area.

The Carbon River Entrance Station is located in the northwest corner of the park off Highway 165 and is the site of the only rainforest at Mount Rainier. There is a campground and a short trail through the rainforest, as well as a trail to the Carbon Glacier, one of the lowest glaciers in the contiguous United States.

Mowich Lake is the largest and deepest lake in the park, located south of Carbon at the south end of Highway 165. A campground, picnic area, and hiking trail are located near the lake.

The two major roads into the northwest quadrant of the Park were severely damaged by the floods of 2006. The ranger station at the Carbon River entrance is staffed during the summer. No motor vehicles are permitted beyond that point.

See also

 Bibliography of Mount Rainier National Park
 Amphibians and reptiles of Mount Rainier National Park
 List of national parks of the United States

References

External links

 of the National Park Service
Static park map and interactive park maps
NPS park history documents – natural and cultural history of the park
National Historic Landmark information (archive)
University of Washington Libraries – black-and-white photographs from a promotional album (ca. 1925)

 
Protected areas established in 1899
Archaeological sites in Washington (state)
Historic American Engineering Record in Washington (state)
National Historic Landmarks in Washington (state)
Old-growth forests
Parks in Lewis County, Washington
Parks in Pierce County, Washington
National Register of Historic Places in Lewis County, Washington
 
1899 establishments in Washington (state)
Mount Rainier